The 2003 All-Ireland Senior Hurling Championship (known for sponsorship reasons as the Guinness Hurling Championship) was the 117th since its establishment in 1887. The first matches of the season were played in May 2003, and the championship ended on 14 September 2003. Kilkenny went into the 2003 championship as defending champions, having won their twenty-seventh All-Ireland title the previous year.

The championship culminated with the All-Ireland final, held at Croke Park, Dublin. The match was contested by Kilkenny and Cork. It was their first meeting in the final since 1999. Kilkenny won the game by 1-14 to 1-11. It was their second All-Ireland title in succession.

Format
The format of the 2003 championship was as follows:

22 counties participated in the 2003 Championship.  These teams were as follows:
 Leinster: Carlow, Dublin, Kildare, Kilkenny, Laois, Meath, Offaly, Westmeath, Wexford and Wicklow.
 Munster: Clare, Cork, Kerry, Limerick, Tipperary and Waterford.
 Connacht: Galway
 Ulster: Antrim, Derry, Down, London and New York.
Provincial Championships

The Leinster, Munster and Ulster championships were played as usual. The Leinster and Munster champions advanced directly to the All-Ireland semi-finals.  The Ulster winners advanced directly to the All-Ireland quarter-final.

Round 1: This round will feature 8 teams involving those beaten at the first round stage in the provincial championships.  An open draw will be made to decide which teams play each other.
Round 2: This round will involve the four winners of Round 1 plus the two beaten provincial finalists from Munster and Leinster.  Another open draw will be made to decide the fixtures.
Quarter-finals: Two quarter-finals will be played between the three winners of Round 2 plus the Ulster Champions.
Semi-finals: These two games will involve the two winners of the quarter-finals plus the two Leinster and Munster champions.

Summary

Championships

Leinster Senior Hurling Championship

Preliminary rounds

Final Rounds

Munster Senior Hurling Championship

Matches

Ulster Senior Hurling Championship

Qualifiers

Qualifiers

All-Ireland 

{{football box |
date = September 7 Final|
team1 = Kilkenny|
score = 1-14 - 1-11 |
team2 = Cork|
goals1 = M. Comerford 1-4; H. Shefflin 0-6 (0-4 frees); T. Walsh 0-3; D. Lyng 0-1 |
goals2 = J. Deane 0-5 (0-4 frees); S. Ó hAilpín 1-0; N. McCarthy 0-2; T. McCarthy, B. O'Connor, J. O'Connor and S. McGrath 0-1 each|
stadium = Croke Park, Dublin | referee = P. O'Connor (Limerick) :Match Report }}

Championship statistics

Scoring
Last goal of the championship: Martin Comerford for Kilkenny against Cork (All-Ireland final)
First hat-trick of the championship: John Mullane for Waterford against Cork (Munster final)
Widest winning margin: 43 pointsAntrim 8-27 : 1-5 London (Ulster preliminary round)
Most goals in a match: 9Antrim 8-27 : 1-5 London (Ulster preliminary round)
Most points in a match: 41Tipperary 3-28 :0-13 Laois (All-Ireland qualifiers)
Most goals by one team in a match: 8Antrim 8-27 : 1-5 London (Ulster preliminary round)
Most goals scored by a losing team: 3Waterford 3-12 : 3-16 Cork  (Munster final)
Carlow 3-7 : 3-15 Waterford (Munster final)
Most points scored by a losing team: 17'''
Galway 1-17 : 1-18 Tipperary (All-Ireland qualifiers)

Overall
Most goals scored - Antrim (13)
Most points scored - Tipperary (91)
Most goals conceded - Carlow and Wexford (10)
Most points conceded - Wexford (102)
Fewest goals scored - Kildare and Wicklow (0)
Fewest points scored - Kildare (7)
Fewest points conceded - Kildare (15)
Fewest goals conceded - Wicklow (0)

Miscellaneous

 The round two qualifier between Wexford and Waterford was the first ever championship meeting between these two teams.
 Kerry return to the Munster Senior Hurling Championship for the first time since 2000.  
 Kerry's Preliminary round wins over Westmeath, Carlow and Derry were the first time they won three All-Ireland series championship games in a row.
 The Preliminary round games between Kerry,Westmeath, Carlow and Derry were the first ever senior championship meetings between these teams.

Top scorers

Season

References

All-Ireland Senior Hurling Championships
1